Juan Alcocer Flores (born 10 January 1955) is a Mexican politician from the National Action Party. From 2000 to 2003 he served as Deputy of the LVIII Legislature of the Mexican Congress representing Guanajuato.

References

1955 births
Living people
Politicians from Guanajuato
People from Salamanca, Guanajuato
National Action Party (Mexico) politicians
21st-century Mexican politicians
20th-century Mexican physicians
Universidad Autónoma de Guadalajara alumni
Deputies of the LVIII Legislature of Mexico
Members of the Chamber of Deputies (Mexico) for Guanajuato